The coat of arms of Beverwijk is a coat of arms that has been renewed several times. The coat of arms of Beverwijk is the only coat of arms of a Dutch municipality that is surrounded by a cloak. This is highly unusual in the Netherlands, where such a cloak is normally reserved for nobility, the pope and national coats of arms.

History 
There are several symbols combined in the coat of arms, amongst them are the three fleurs de lis, who can be found in the oldest known coat of arms of Beverwijk. This oldest coat of arms is actually a seal. This seal dates from 1322 and it shows not three but four fleur de lye standing on top of a shield.

In 1548 and 1561 Beverwijk used three fleur de lye, but underneath these three there are waves and above the fleur de lye two figures of uncertain origin (possibly roosters) and topping those a label. In the same period the city used a second seal depicting only the three fleur de lis. In 1601 a seal was used showing four lions with underneath waves on top of a label and three fleur de lis in the chief. These three fleur de lis are positioned in the formation of 2 + 1. This seal also has supporters in the form of two naked boys holding up a mantle. A seal dating from 1615 has the same scenery except the boys have been swapped for a winged head above the shield.

Origin 
The lions in the coat of arms derive form the coat of arms of John of Beaumont, lord of Blois en Wijk. Beverwijk was the capital of the Bailiff Wijk. The fleur de lis are from the old Beverwijk of the 14th century.

Blazon 
There are three known blazons from either the city or the municipality of Beverwijk. The first by the High Councill of Nobility recorded blazon was: 

This blazon is about the coat of arms of 26 June 1816. The second coat of arms is of 10 November 1899, a small number of changed have been made, amongst them are the supporters. This blazon is as follows: 

The blazon was changed on 24 Octobre 1936, but the actual coat of arms wasn't changed. The new blazon was needed because the municipality of Beverwijk was merged with the municipality of Wijk aan Zee en Duin.

References 

Municipal coats of arms in the Netherlands
Coats of arms with lions
Coats of arms with fleurs de lis